Los Castillos is a corregimiento in Parita District, Herrera Province, Panama with a population of 745 as of 2010. Its population as of 1990 was 646; its population as of 2000 was 647.

References

Corregimientos of Herrera Province